The 2008 Villa Canales bus disaster occurred in the municipality of Villa Canales, Guatemala on 29 February 2008, at 19:15 local time. A passenger bus from Transportes Cubanita, with 79 people on board, crashed into a 10-meter ravine after missing a sharp bend in the road connecting Villa Canales to Barberena. 54 people died and another 25 were wounded in the accident.

See also
 2013 San Martin Jilotepeque bus disaster

References

Bus incidents in Guatemala
Villa Canales bus disaster
2008 in Guatemala